The Madonna and Child is an oil on wood painting by the Italian High Renaissance painter Raphael, executed c. 1503. It is housed in the Norton Simon Museum in Pasadena, California.

See also
List of paintings by Raphael

Notes

References

External links
 

1503 paintings
Paintings of the Madonna and Child by Raphael
Paintings in the collection of the Norton Simon Museum
Nude art
Books in art